Speak of the Devil is the seventh studio album by the American rock musician Chris Isaak, released in 1998.

Track listing

Personnel
Chris Isaak - vocals, guitar
Hershel Yatovitz - guitar, vocals
Rowland Salley - bass, vocals
Kenney Dale Johnson - drums, vocals
with:
Rob Cavallo - additional guitar on "Please" and "Walk Slow"
Curt Bisquera, Cynthia Corra, Dave Palmer, Frank Martin, Jamie Muhoberac, Jimmy Pugh, John Pierce, Julie Lorch, Mark Needham, Mary Dunaway, Matt Chamberlain, Patrick Warren, Steve Ferrone, Terry Wood, Weddy Waller - additional musicians
Technical
Chris Lord-Alge (tracks 1,2,5-8,11), Mark Needham (tracks 3,4,9,10,12-14) - mixing
Chris Isaak (tracks 4-6,9,12-14), Erik Jacobsen (tracks 1-3,7-12), Rob Cavallo (track 4) - producer
Melanie Nissen - photography

Charts

Sales and certifications

References

External links
Chris Isaak official website

Chris Isaak albums
1998 albums
Reprise Records albums
Albums produced by Erik Jacobsen
Albums produced by Rob Cavallo